Geoff Andrew (born Northampton, England, 1954)  is a British writer and lecturer on film, and currently Programmer-at-large at BFI South Bank. After studying at Northampton Grammar School and going on to gain a First in Classics at King's College, Cambridge, he was for some years programmer at London's Electric Cinema in Notting Hill, and later became the editor and chief critic of the film section of Time Out magazine. In 1999 he was appointed Programmer of London's National Film Theatre (later renamed BFI Southbank).

Andrew is a regular contributor to Sight & Sound and has contributed essays and articles to many books and journals. He is the author of a number of books on the cinema, including BFI Modern Classics books on Abbas Kiarostami (10) and Krzysztof Kieślowski’s Three Colours Trilogy; The Films of Nicholas Ray, Stranger Than Paradise: Maverick Film-makers in Recent American Cinema, The Film Handbook and Film Directors A-Z – The Art of the World’s Greatest Film-makers. He also edited Film: The Critics' Choice.  In 2003, he served on the Un Certain Regard jury at the Cannes Film Festival; he has also served on juries in Venice, Cluj, Turin, Istanbul, Sarajevo, Morelia, Krakow and Brussels.

Among other areas of film, he has shown particular interest in French cinema. In 2009, the French government made him a Chevalier de l'Ordre des Arts et des Lettres for his contribution to French cinema.

Andrew participated in the 2012 Sight & Sound critics' poll, where he listed his ten favorite films as follows: L'Atalante, Citizen Kane, The General, His Girl Friday, La Morte Rouge, My Night with Maud, Ordet, Persona, Ten, and Tokyo Story''.

He writes on film, music and others arts at GeoffAndrew.com.

References

External links
Geoff Andrew at Rotten Tomatoes
Geoff Andrew on Twitter

1954 births
Living people
British film critics
British Film Institute
British film historians
Chevaliers of the Ordre des Arts et des Lettres
Alumni of King's College, Cambridge